André Luis Gaspar Janones (born 5 May 1984) is a Brazilian lawyer, politician, and member of Avante. Since 2019, he has been a federal deputy for Minas Gerais.

Biography 
He was born in Ituiutaba, on 5 May 1984. He is the son of Divina Gaspar Janones.

His first job was as a bus conductor between 2003 and 2005. In 2004, he got a scholarship at the then Fundação Educacional de Ituiutaba, now a unit of the Minas Gerais State University.

In 2005, he started working as a clerk at the Court of Justice of the State of Minas Gerais, in Ituiutaba. In 2008, he passed the Order of Attorneys of Brazil exam and set up his firm André Janones & Advogados Associados.

He is a member of the Lagoinha Church.

Political career 
In 2016, he ran for mayor of Ituiutaba, finishing in second place with 13,759 votes (24.40% of valid votes). He gained notoriety when he proclaimed himself one of the main leaders of the truck drivers' strike in Brazil in 2018 and, as a result, he ended up being elected federal deputy in the 2018 elections. He was the third most voted federal deputy in Minas Gerais, receiving 178,660 votes (1.77% of the valid votes in the election). He was highlighted during the Auxílio Emergencial votes, where his live on Facebook became the most commented on in the western world, with 3.3 million views and 177 thousand comments, equaling the mark of the sertanejo singer Marília Mendonça .

On 29 January 2022, his pre-candidacy for the Presidency of the Republic, by his party, Avante, was made official. On August 4, 2022, during a live broadcast alongside former president and candidate Luiz Inácio Lula da Silva, Janones withdrew from the candidacy to support the PT. “From that moment on, our candidacy is unified and starts to be represented by the candidacy of President Lula”, he declared.

References

External links 
 

Living people
1984 births
Members of the Chamber of Deputies (Brazil) from Minas Gerais
Avante (political party) politicians
Social Christian Party (Brazil) politicians
Workers' Party (Brazil) politicians
Brazilian Baptists
Brazilian lawyers
21st-century Brazilian politicians